Centromere protein U is a protein that in humans is encoded by the CENPU gene.

References

Further reading